The World Federation of Liberal and Radical Youth (WFLRY) was an international liberal youth organization. It had a global outreach, but consisted mainly of national youth organizations from Europe.

WFLRY was founded in 1947 in Cambridge, United Kingdom. In 1969 the organization was split, resulting in the separate forming of European Federation of Liberal and Radical Youth (EFLRY). WFLRY was dissolved in 1978.

Leadership of WFLRY

References

1947 establishments in England
1978 disestablishments in England
Organisations based in Cambridge
Youth organisations based in England